Stanisław Gronkowski (January 8, 1922 Radom – May 20, 2004 Kraków) was a Polish actor who performed at the Rhapsodic Theatre and the Old Theatre of Helena Modrzejewska in Kraków.

In 1989 Gronkowski was awarded the Officer's Cross of OOP.

Gronkowski died in 2004, and was buried in Kraków at the Salwator cemetery.

Filmography 

 Podhale w ogniu (1955) as a peasant
 Wolne miasto (1958) as a phone receptionist Kozubek
 Kalosze szczęścia (1958) as Tadeusz Kościuszko, the actor
 Inspekcja pana Anatola (1959) as a receptionist in a hotel
 Spotkania w mroku (Begegnung im Zwielicht, 1960)
 Zobaczymy się w niedzielę (1960) as Flower
 Spotkanie ze szpiegiem (1964) as the teacher Mituła
 Cała naprzód (1966) as the officer
 Four Tank-men and a dog (1966-1970) as Kugel
 Ściana Czarownic (1966) as Szczygieł (unnamed in titles)
 Słońce wschodzi raz na dzień (1967) as Wigezy
 How I unleashed World War II (1969) as "Wilk", a partizan
 Południk zero (1970) as Peruczka
 Podróż za jeden uśmiech (1971) as a participant of the holidays
 Sędziowie. Tragedya (1974) as a meyer
 Opowieść w czerwieni (1974) as a cinema operator
 Racławice. 1794 (1979) as Tadeusz Kościuszko
 Ród Gąsieniców (1979)
 Z biegiem lat, z biegiem dni... (1980) as Trybulak
 Droga (1980) as the father of Szymon
 Nocny gość  (1989) as a leper

External links 

 Stanisław Gronkowski on the pictures of Polish Theater's Encyclopaedia
 Stanisław Gronkowski on the pictures of database for National Film Library "Fototeka"

References

1922 births
2004 deaths
Polish male actors
People from Radom
Burials at Salwator Cemetery